The Susquehanna and Eagles Mere Railroad was a logging railroad operating from 1902 to 1930 in Sullivan and Lycoming Counties in Pennsylvania in the United States.

The railroad was originally built from the Eagles Mere Railroad near Eagles Mere  to the lumber mill at Sonesville on Kettle Creek. Because the Eagles Mere Railroad was a  narrow gauge, the Susquehanna and Eagles Mere Railroad was built to a  gauge as well. The Susquehanna and Eagles Mere Railroad was abandoned in sections between 1922 and 1930, as the lumber it was built to transport was depleted.

References

Defunct Pennsylvania railroads
Transportation in Lycoming County, Pennsylvania
Transportation in Sullivan County, Pennsylvania
Logging railroads in the United States
Narrow gauge railroads in Pennsylvania
3 ft gauge railways in the United States